{{DISPLAYTITLE:C14H18O3}}

The molecular formula C14H18O3 (molar mass : 234.29 g/mol) may refer to:

 Gyrinal, a powerful antiseptic and fish and mammal toxin
 Stiripentol, an anticonvulsant drug used in the treatment of epilepsy